Misaje is a town and commune in Donga-Mantung department in the Northwest Region of Cameroon. The town lies at the top of the Ring Road, about 15 kilometers west of Nkambé, where the Ring Road meets the road north to Dumbu and the border with Nigeria.

The name Misaje comes from a Hausa nickname for a bearded man who sold food and rented rooms to kola traders on their way to and from Takum. The village containing his stop came to be called Misaje and the name was later applied to the whole commune.

Different local dialects predominate in different parts of the subdivision. Ncane is spoken from Misaje south. Nsari is spoken around Kamine and Akweto. Kemezung is spoken in Dumbu and Kwei. Bebe is spoken around Bebe-Jama and Bebe-Jatto. Mungong is spoken at Mungong. All mentioned so far are similar, grouped by linguists as Eastern Beboid languages. More distantly related, Jukun is spoken to the north around Gidan-Jikum.

Misaje commune was created in 1992, with headquarters at the town of Misaje, and including the villages Nkanchi, Dumbu, Kamine, Akweto, Bebe-Kete, Mayo-Kila, Bebe-Jato, Sabon-gida, Bem, Chunghe, Kibbo, Kwe, Mbissa, Mfume and Chako. Terrain varies from rugged in the east around Mount Kinka to a flat plain around the Dumbo Ranch in the west. The Dumbo Ranch is a parastatal project aimed at improving beef production using modern techniques. The total population of Misaje commune is about 40,000. Many people live by farming maize, cassava, groundnuts, beans, yams, potatoes, sweet potatoes, cabbage, carrots and okra.  Some raise cattle. Some trade, hunt and fish.

See also
Communes of Cameroon

Notes

References
 
 Contrôle de gestion et performance des services publics communaux des villes camerounaises - Thèse de Donation Avele, Université Montesquieu Bordeaux IV 
 
 
 Charles Nanga, La réforme de l’administration territoriale au Cameroun à la lumière de la loi constitutionnelle n° 96/06 du 18 janvier 1996, Mémoire ENA. 
 
 

Communes of Northwest Region (Cameroon)